Kason is the second month of the traditional Burmese calendar.

Festivals and observances
 
Full Moon of Kason
 Bodhi Tree Watering Festival

Kason symbols
Flower: Magnolia champaca

References

See also
Burmese calendar
Festivals of Burma

Burmese culture
Months of the Burmese calendar